Posobkovo is a rural locality (a village) in Nikolskoye Rural Settlement, Kaduysky District, Vologda Oblast, Russia. The population was 10 as of 2002.

Geography 
Posobkovo is located 40 km northeast of Kaduy (the district's administrative centre) by road. Markovskaya is the nearest rural locality.

References 

Rural localities in Kaduysky District